Good Friendly Violent Fun is a live album by American thrash metal band Exodus. The performance on this live album was from the band's 1989 tour, but not released until two years later. The name is derived from a lyric found in the Exodus song "The Toxic Waltz", from the band's 1989 album Fabulous Disaster.

Track listing
 Fabulous Disaster – 5:46
 Chemi-Kill – 6:09
 'Til Death Do Us Part – 5:07
 The Toxic Waltz – 4:39
 Cajun Hell – 5:55
 Corruption – 5:37
 Brain Dead – 4:31
 Dirty Deeds Done Dirt Cheap – 4:42 (AC/DC cover)

Band line-up
Steve "Zetro" Souza – vocals
Gary Holt – guitars
Rick Hunolt – guitars
Rob McKillop – bass
John Tempesta – drums

Credits
Recorded on July 14, 1989 at the Fillmore in San Francisco
Recorded by Westwood One
Mixed by Marc Senesac (assisted by Kyle Johnson) at Soma Sync Studio in San Francisco
Mastered by Ken Lee at the Rocket Lab in San Francisco
Artwork by Sean Wyett
Design by Kathy Milone
Photos by Ienny Raisler and Gene Ambo

References

Exodus (American band) albums
1991 live albums
Live thrash metal albums
Relativity Records live albums